Baghban is a 2003 Indian Hindi-language drama film directed by Ravi Chopra, co-written and produced by B. R. Chopra. It tells the story of an elderly couple, Raj (Amitabh Bachchan) and Pooja (Hema Malini), who have been married for 40 years. After Raj retires, they reunite with their four sons (Aman Verma, Samir Soni, Saahil Chadha, and Nasir Khan) to discuss who will support them. None of the sons want to take care of both parents, causing Raj and Pooja to live separately.

Baghban was conceived by producer and co-writer B. R. Chopra during his 1960s trip across Europe, when he visited a retirement home and was inspired by the householders' story. Although the screenplay was finished in 1973, Chopra did not begin production for decades because he was busy with other projects. After he revived it, principal photography began in July 2002 in Film City with cinematographer Barun Mukherjee. During post-production, it was edited by Shailendra Doke, Godfrey Gonsalves, and Shashi Mane. Baghban soundtrack was composed by Aadesh Shrivastava and Uttam Singh, with lyrics by Sameer.

The film premiered at the Leeds International Film Festival on 2 October 2003, and was released worldwide the following day. It received mixed reviews from critics; Bachchan and Malini's performances were praised, but the film's storyline and the chemistry between the lead actors were criticised. They received the Screen Award for Jodi No. 1, however, and Bachchan and Malini were nominated for Best Actor and Best Actress at the 49th Filmfare Awards. Over the years via airing on television channels, it has gained cult status.

Plot 
Raj and his wife, Pooja, have been married for 40 years and have four sons of their own: Ajay, Sanjay, Rohit, and Karan. They also have an adopted son, Alok, who falls in love with Arpita. Raj provides the orphaned Alok with money and education, raising him as his own son. Now successful, Alok venerates Raj because of his help. Raj retires and cannot support himself; he and Pooja decide to leave their home. They want to live with their children, who are unwilling. The children decide to split their parents up; each lives with one of the boys for the next six months. They think that their parents will refuse the offer and remain in their home. However, Raj and Pooja reluctantly accept the offer.

They endure separation and poor treatment by their children. Raj stays first with Sanjay, and then with Rohit; Pooja stays first with Ajay, and then with Karan. While he is living with Sanjay, the only affection Raj receives is from his grandson Rahul. Saddened by the way he has been treated by his children, Raj writes about how he fulfilled his children's dreams and his treatment in return; he also writes about his love for his wife, and the pain their separation has caused. Raj's writing eventually becomes a novel. Pooja is abused by Ajay, her daughter-in-law Kiran, and her granddaughter Payal. Payal, however, repents when Pooja saves her from being raped by her boyfriend and showers Pooja with love.

Changing trains after six months, Pooja and Raj spend time together in Vijaynagar. They encounter Alok, who brings them to his home and cares for them. Raj learns that his writings have been published as Baghban, named after Hemant (a café owner whom he befriended during his stay with Sanjay). The novel is successful, giving Raj the money he needs to support himself and Pooja. Their sons ask their parents to forgive them, attending a book ceremony with their wives. Raj and Pooja refuse to forgive the four sons, however, and disown them for the pain they have caused.

Cast 
The cast is listed below:

 Amitabh Bachchan as Raj Malhotra
 Hema Malini as Pooja Malhotra
 Salman Khan as Alok Malhotra 
 Mahima Chaudhry as Arpita Malhotra 
 Aman Verma as Ajay Malhotra
 Samir Soni as Sanjay Malhotra
 Saahil Chadha as Rohit Malhotra
 Nasir Khan as Karan Malhotra
 Divya Dutta as Reena Malhotra
 Suman Ranganathan as Kiran Malhotra
 Rimi Sen as Payal Malhotra
 Paresh Rawal as Hemant Patel
 Lillete Dubey as Shanti Patel
 Mohan Joshi as Khuber Desai
 Sharat Saxena as Ram Avtaar
 Arzoo Govitrikar as Priya Malhotra
 Anang Desai as Mr. Desai
 Yash Pathak as Rahul Malhotra
 Avtar Gill as Rawat
 Asrani as Bedi
 Gajendra Chauhan as a car salesman
 Nakul Vaid as Kapil Desai
 Sanjeeda Sheikh as Nilli

Production 
The idea for Baghban came to director and producer B. R. Chopra in Copenhagen during a tour across Europe in the 1960s, when he stayed at a hotel next to a retirement home. In a Screen interview, Chopra said that when he sat on the hotel balcony, he saw elderly people sitting at the bungalows. After several days, he joined a couple there and struck up a conversation about their personal lives. The couple talked about feeling abandoned by their children and grandchildren, inspiring Chopra to make a film. During a 1973 holiday in Lonavla, he began writing the screenplay one afternoon and continued for fourteen hours; he finished it the next morning.

Chopra met his son, Ravi Chopra, back in Mumbai. Ravi was filming the action drama Zameer, a 1975 release starring Amitabh Bachchan and Saira Banu. During the filming, Banu told Ravi that she was tired and wanted to continue filming at Pali Hill. B. R. Chopra told his close friend, Dilip Kumar, that he wanted to make a film with him. Several years later, at a ceremony honouring Chopra's films, he asked Kumar about the project; the actor suggested casting Rakhee Gulzar as his wife, but Chopra did not do so. Banu became ill and went to London with her husband, Kumar. B. R. and Ravi Chopra were busy with Doordarshan's epic series Mahabharat (1988–1990), and Baghban was shelved. According to Ravi Chopra (who liked the story and wanted to direct it), he tried several times to revive the production but his other projects "kept coming to the fore".

After years in development hell, the project was revived. Achala Nagar was chosen to help B. R. Chopra write the screenplay, dialogue, and story; Satish Bhatnagar, Ram Govind, and Shafiq Ansari co-wrote them, and Salim Khan and Javed Akhtar polished the dialogue. The role of Raj Malhotra, for which Ravi Chopra had wanted Kumar, was given to Bachchan because the former actor was too old to play a 60-year-old man. Hema Malini was cast as Pooja, who is five years younger than Raj. The Chopras originally wanted a much-younger actress to star with Bachchan, but they changed their minds to avoid difficulty with the make-up a younger actress would require. Although Malini was initially reluctant to play a film role unless she liked it, she did not want to disappoint her fans. When she heard the story, she said she had waited a long time for a film suited for her age.  Neeta Lulla and B. R. Chopra's daughter-in-law, Renu, were her costume designers.

Baghban principal photography began in Film City on 18 July 2002. Ravi Chopra told journalist Roshmila Bhattacharya that he was nervous during that period, and called it "an exam" for him. Ashok Bhushan and Keshto Mondal designed the sets, and Vaibhavi Merchant choreographed the songs. In January 2003, it was reported that Salman Khan and Mahima Chaudhry would appear in the film. Portions of Baghban were also filmed in London, and it was edited by Shailendra Doke, Godfrey Gonsalves, and Shashi Mane.

Soundtrack 

Aadesh Shrivastava composed the soundtrack for Baghban, with lyrics by Sameer (except for "Holi Khele Raghuveera", by Harivansh Rai Bachchan). Shrivastava asked Amitabh Bachchan (with whom he had a rapport) to sing the song because he wanted the actor "to convey much more [...] right emotions", although Bachchan was initially unwilling. Udit Narayan, Alka Yagnik, Shrivastava, Hema Sardesai, Sudesh Bhosale, Richa Sharma, Jonita Gandhi, Sukhwinder Singh, Aastha Gill also performed the vocals. Uttam Singh had composed two songs for the film before he was replaced by Shrivastava. Shrivastava said that he was recording a song with Sufi singer Abida Parveen but did not want to finish it, believing that it would not "work". T-Series released the album on 23 August 2003.

The soundtrack had a positive response from music critics and, according to Shrivastava, gave him a chance to demonstrate his versatility. A Hindu reviewer called Bachchan the album's highlight and praised all the songs; "Holi Khele Raghuveera" resembled "Rang Barse Bhige Chunar Wali" from the 1981 romantic drama, Silsila. Aniket Joshi wrote for Planet Bollywood, "Aadesh Shrivastava has done well with this album and it looks like he will score big time. In the future though, it would help if he chooses to experiment more and remain less ordinary." In a mixed review for Mid-Day, Narendra Kusnur called the album "a good break" for Shrivastava but felt that the instrumental version of "Main Yahan Tu Wahan" was "far too lengthy". Joginder Tuteja of Bollywood Hungama gave the album three-and-a-half out of five stars, saying that it had no songs "that can be singled out to be 'not good.

According to the Box Office India website, Baghban soundtrack album was the year's ninth-bestselling with 1.4 million units sold. Shrivastava told journalist Salma Khatib of Screen that "Holi Khele Raghuveera" was popular in Madhya Pradesh and Uttar Pradesh.

Release 
Baghban had pre-release publicity because of its pairing of Amitabh Bachchan and Malini for the first time since the action film Andha Kanoon (1983). B. R. and Ravi Chopra had great expectations for the film, which they targeted to family audiences. It premiered at the Leeds International Film Festival on 2 October 2003, and was released worldwide the following day. Opening during Vijayadashami, the film had competition from Yusuf Khan's action thriller Khel: No Ordinary Game and Chandan Arora's comedy-drama Main Madhuri Dixit Banna Chahti Hoon. Baghban ran in theatres for 25 weeks, becoming a silver jubilee film. It was released on DVD on 17 November of that year in NTSC widescreen format. It has been available for streaming on Amazon Prime Video since 30 November 2016.

According to journalists, the positive word-of-mouth for Baghban played an important role in the film's commercial success. It was released on 275 screens across India and grossed  on its first day, earning  by the end of its first weekend and  after running for a week. Abroad, the film earned  in its first week. After its overseas theatrical run, it grossed  (the year's third-highest-grossing Indian film overseas); in its year-end box-office report, The Hindu said that most of its revenue was from Asian countries. Summing up the film's gross in India and overseas, Box Office India estimated that Baghban earned  (the fifth-highest-grossing Indian film of 2003).

Adjusted for inflation, the film has grossed 154.6 crores ($18.8 million) as of 2023. 

It was remade in Kannada as Ee Bandhana, a 2007 film directed by Vijayalakshmi Singh which received critical acclaim.

Critical reception 
Baghban had mixed reviews from critics, who praised its performances (primarily those of Bachchan and Malini) but panned the chemistry between the actors and the film's story. For Bollywood Hungama, Taran Adarsh gave it two stars and said that Bachchan delivered a "powerful" and "memorable" performance; Adarsh said that Malini was "elegant and conveys the pathos convincingly". Seema Pant of Rediff.com praised the film: "Baghban has a high emotional quotient. Director Ravi Chopra retains his audience's interest in the lives of Raj and Puja Malhotra. Despite some unconvincing moments in the plot, Baghban keeps the viewers involved all the way to the climax." Director and critic Khalid Mohamed gave the film three stars, saying that it "is unthinkable without the imperishable grace and beauty projected" from Malini. However, he compared its direction to Indian television shampoo advertisements and called its cinematography and production design as "old worldly as bell bottoms".

Ziya Us Salam said, "[Ravi] Chopra, on his part, brings a rare sight to the Indian screen. Here the aged couple is, yes, aged. Yet the romance is still very much a part of their life. The ardour for physical fulfilment may have gone but the need for proximity is there." Mid-Day Narendra Kusnur called Bachchan's performance one of his best since the 1990s, and—according to Manjula Negi of the Hindustan Times—he "carries forward the plot" along with Malini. Ram Kamal Mukherjee of Stardust wrote that Baghban remains one of the decade's finest Bollywood films; Mukherjee said that Salman Khan delivered a "seasoned" performance, but Chaudhry was a "total waste". Filmfare critic Gautam Buragohain was ambivalent about the film, enjoying the performances but finding the story "stale"; he believed the plot was based on a similar film (the 1983 drama Avtaar), and dismissed Baghban as "predictable". Omar Ahmed of Empire praised Baghban for its exploration of family values and Indian culture.

Parag Chandrabala Maniar, who reviewed the film for B4U, agreed with Buragohain about the film's similarity to Avtaar but gave Baghban a more-positive reception. Calling the first part of Baghban was "predictable" and "hackneyed", he said that Bachchan was "excellent" as Raj. The character was "conveying love, anger and pain through his intelligent eyes. Bachchan makes the film worth a watch!" According to Rajen Garabadu of NDTV, "Baghban dwells on the new generation, their false aspirations and confused priorities [...] The film is replete with its fair share of drama (sometimes a little exaggerated), song and dance sequences and a couple of blows delivered here and there. Ravi Chopra has not experimented too much. He has wisely invested in human love, affection and familial bonding to reap the rewards for him." In The Afternoon Despatch & Courier, Deepa Gahlot called the film's plot "terribly worn out" and "very 60s", but the chemistry of Bachchan and Malini (and their performances) satisfied the audience and concealed the film's flaws.

In The Times of India, Parul Gupta described Khan's brief appearance as Raj's and Pooja's adopted son as "a picture of the obedient offspring" and called the film "larger-than-life". Sify's Kunal Shah said that although he was sure that Chopra had addressed the themes in his previous work, the director "has been successful in coming up with good performances from the lead cast". Namrata Joshi of Outlook criticised the film's length and number of "family functions". She praised the performances (especially Bachchan's), and said the film "seems to have been tailormade" for his fans. Joshi said that Bachchan overshadowed Malini with his "perfect efficiency and elan", but he praised Malini's "fetching and elegant" look. K. N. Vijiyan of the New Straits Times called the film "the perfect comeback vehicle" for Malini, and Derek Elley of Variety said: "It takes stars of Bachchan and Hema Malini's stature to make the confection work, and luckily they're both up to the job, creating a palpable sense of the couple’s mutual affection ..."

Accolades

Notes

References

External links 

2003 films
2000s Hindi-language films
Indian drama films
Hindi films remade in other languages
Films shot in London
Films scored by Aadesh Shrivastava
Films directed by Ravi Chopra
2003 drama films
Hindi-language drama films